Rush Rhees Library  is the main academic library of the University of Rochester in Rochester, New York. It is one of the most visible and recognizable landmarks on the university's River Campus. Construction began in 1927 with the other original River Campus buildings and the library was dedicated in 1930. It is named after Benjamin Rush Rhees, the university's third president. A major addition was added in 1970, which now houses the main computer lab, additional stacks and office space. Rush Rhees is the flagship of the River Campus Libraries System, which holds about 3 million volumes. The library featured an elevator completely original from 1930 until 2021 when it received a full modernization.

Rush Rhees Tower
It features 50 bells imported from the Netherlands and weighs in at 6,668 lb (3,025 kg). The carillon chimes on the quarter-hour and weekly recitals are given by students and guests. An annual recital series is held during the summer.

Rossell Hope Robbins Library
Located on the 4th floor of Rush Rhees is the Rossell Hope Robbins Library, which houses a non-circulating medieval studies collection of more than 20,000 volumes. In addition to its holdings in all aspects of Middle English Literature, it also contains holdings in Old English, Anglo-Norman, and medieval French literature; medieval history, philosophy, theology, and art; manuscript studies; witchcraft; and Arthurian and Robin Hood studies. The collection was donated by medievalist Rossell Hope Robbins and his wife Helen Ann Mins Robbins in 1987 and, at the time, appraised for more than $750,000. Robbins also set provisions for new acquisitions and established a trust of $160,000 for a fellowship program.

References

External links

River Campus Libraries
Rush Rhees Library
Hopeman Memorial Carillon

1930 establishments in New York (state)
Bell towers in the United States
Educational buildings in Rochester, New York
Carillons
Library buildings completed in 1930
Libraries in New York (state)
Tourist attractions in Rochester, New York
University and college academic libraries in the United States
University of Rochester